This is a list of properties and districts that are listed on the National Register of Historic Places in the Northwest quadrant of Washington, D.C. which are west of Rock Creek.

Current listings

|}

Former listing

|}

See also 
 National Register of Historic Places listings in the upper NW Quadrant of Washington, D. C.
 National Register of Historic Places listings in central Washington, D.C.

References 

Western
.